Hugo Marcelo Ovelar Irrazábal (born 21 February 1971) is a Paraguayan former professional footballer, who played for clubs in Paraguay, Argentina, Chile, Mexico and Bolivia and in the Paraguay national team at the 1997 Copa América and 1999 Copa América.

He currently is a football manager.

He was born in Concepción, Paraguay.

Coaching career

Pasaquina
In December 2015, Ovelar signed as new coach of Pasaquina of the Salvadoran Primera División, replacing Víctor Coreas. In January 2017, Ovelar was replaced by Omar Sevilla.

Municipal Limeño
In February 2016, Ovelar signed as new coach of Municipal Limeño, replacing Francisco Robles for the rest of the Clausura 2017. In December 2017, Ovelar was replaced by Emiliano Barrera.

Sonsonate
In September 2018, Ovelar was announced as new coach of Sonsonate, replacing Mario Elias Guevara for the rest of the Apertura 2018, after a 2–5 defeat against Alianza. In December 2018, Ovelar was replaced by Nelson Mauricio Ancheta.

Honours

Club
Cobreloa
 Primera División de Chile (2): 2003 Apertura, 2003 Clausura

References

External links
 
 Hugo Ovelar at playmakerstats.com (English version of ceroacero.es)
 
 
 

1971 births
Living people
People from Concepción, Paraguay
Paraguayan footballers
Paraguayan expatriate footballers
Paraguay international footballers
Santos Laguna footballers
La Paz F.C. players
Cerro Porteño players
Club Guaraní players
2 de Mayo footballers
Sportivo Patria footballers
Club Sol de América footballers
San Lorenzo de Almagro footballers
Cobreloa footballers
Paraguayan Primera División players
Liga MX players
Expatriate footballers in Chile
Expatriate footballers in Argentina
Expatriate footballers in Mexico
Expatriate footballers in Bolivia
1997 Copa América players
1999 Copa América players
Association football forwards
Municipal Limeño managers
Paraguayan football managers
Deportivo Santaní managers